Piast the Wheelwright ( 740/741? – 861 AD; Latin: Past Ckosisconis, Pazt filius Chosisconisu; Polish: Piast Chościskowic, Piast Kołodziej , Piast Oracz or Piast) was a semi-legendary figure in medieval Poland (9th century AD), and the presumed founder of the Piast dynasty that would rule the future Kingdom of Poland.

Legend 
Piast makes an appearance in the Polish Chronicle of Gallus Anonymus, along with his father, Chościsko, and Piast's wife, Rzepicha.

The chronicle tells the story of an unexpected visit paid to Piast by two strangers. They ask to join Piast's family in celebration of the 7th birthday (a pagan rite of passage for young boys) of Piast's son, Siemowit. In return for the hospitality, the guests cast a spell making Piast's cellar ever full of plenty. Seeing this, Piast's compatriots declare him their new prince, to replace the late Prince Popiel.

If Piast really existed, he would have been the great-great-grandfather of Prince Mieszko I (c. 930–92), the first historic ruler of Poland, and the great-great-great-grandfather of Bolesław I the Brave (967–1025), the first Polish king.

The legendary Piasts were native of Gniezno, a well-fortified castle town founded between the eighth and ninth century, within the tribal territory of the Polans.

According to legend, he died in 861 aged 120 years.

Legacy 

In over 1,000 years of Polish history no one else bore the name Piast.

Two theories explain the etymology of the word Piast. The first gives the root as piasta ("hub" in Polish), a reference to his profession.  The second relates Piast to piastun ("custodian" or "keeper"). This could hint at Piast's initial position as a majordomo, or a "steward of the house", in the court of another ruler, and the subsequent takeover of power by Piast. This would parallel the development of the early medieval Frankish dynasties, when the Mayors of the Palace of the Merovingian kings gradually usurped political control.

References 

740s births
861 deaths
Year of birth uncertain
9th-century Polish monarchs
9th-century Slavs
Founding monarchs
Legendary Polish monarchs
People whose existence is disputed
Piast dynasty
Slavic pagans
Longevity myths